The Galician independence movement or the Galician separatist movement (Galician: independentismo galego) is a political movement (derived from Galician nationalism) which supports the independence of Galicia and Galicia irredenta (the claim of Galician-speaking territories outside the Autonomous Community of Galicia: As Portelas, O Bierzo, and Terra Eo-Navia) from Spain, plus the North Region from Portugal (Gallaecia).

History

Initiation
The first realization was the organized political committee Comité Revoluzonareo Arredista Galego, formed by Fuco Gomez in Cuba in the 1920s, but during the Second Spanish Republic did not have much significance. In Argentina there was an association called Sociedade Nazonalista Pondal, active mostly in the 1930s.

Republic of Galicia

In 1931, Galicia declared its independence. The next day, Galicia rejoined Spain.

Franco and the 1970s

In the 1970s, a sector of the Galician People's Union near of Moncho Reboiras tried to organize a rebel group against the Francoist dictatorship of Spain following the model of ETA, but ended with the murder of Moncho Reboiras. In 1978, a sector of the Galician People's Union was split, constituting first the Galician People's Union-Proletarian Line and later the Galician Party of the Proletariat, with secessionist character.

Galician independentism at present
In 1986 the Communist Party of National Liberation, a secessionist splinter of the Galician People's Union, was expelled from the BNG for having supported the candidacy of Herri Batasuna during the Elections to the European Parliament. Beside the Galiza Ceive-OLN (the new name of the organization) and several secessionist groups, they formed the Galician People's Front the following year, which has been the main Galician secessionist organization since then.

In that context appeared the Exército Guerrilheiro do Povo Galego Ceive, which carried out 90 terrorist actions in six years, the last one on 13 of September, 1991. As consequence two activists, a civil guard and a girl died. Several dozens of supposed members were arrested.

Ten members of Assembleia da Mocidade Independentista and other groups were held in 2005 and two of them were strongly suspected of having placed a bomb in an automatic cash dispenser in Santiago de Compostela. That same year the existence of a group named Resistência Galega, which has claimed responsibility for several bomb attacks, was made public.

The BNG and Anova-Nationalist Brotherhood, the two nationalist/secessionist political parties, have 19 of the 75 seats in the Galician Parliament.

Pro-independence public figures
Xose Manuel Beiras, politician. 
Xosé Luís Méndez Ferrín, writer, candidate to the Nobel Prize of Literature in 1999, ex-president of the Royal Galician Academy and member of the Galician People's Front.
José Ignacio Fernández Palacios, ex-football player.
Alfonso Daniel Rodríguez Castelao, Galician politician, writer, painter and doctor.
Camilo Nogueira Román, politician.
Rosalia de Castro, Galician romanticist writer and poet.
Ricardo Carvalho Calero, father of the reintegrationist movement, founder of the Galician Association of Language and writer.
Uxío Novoneyra, poet, journalist and writer of children's literature.
Teresa Moure, writer and feminist. She lectures in Linguistics at the University of Santiago de Compostela. 
Lois Pereiro, poet. 
Rafa Villar, writer, activist of the Nunca Máis movement and town councillor in Santiago de Compostela.
Milladoiro, folk and Celtic music band from A Coruña.
Ricardo Flores Peres, political activist.

See also
Galician nationalism
Galicia irredenta
Gallaecia
Kingdom of Galicia
Pan-Celticism
Republic of Galicia
Galicia–North Portugal Euroregion
Galician Nationalist Bloc
National and regional identity in Spain

References

Politics of Galicia (Spain)
Galician nationalism
Separatism in Portugal
Separatism in Spain
Independence movements